North Tyneside Metropolitan Borough Council elections are generally held three years out of every four, with a third of the council being elected each time. North Tyneside Borough Council, generally known as North Tyneside Council is the local authority for the metropolitan borough of North Tyneside in Tyne and Wear, England. Since 2002 the borough has been led by the directly elected Mayor of North Tyneside.

Political control
North Tyneside was created under the Local Government Act 1972 as a metropolitan borough, with Tyne and Wear County Council providing county-level services. The first election to the council was held in 1973, initially operating as a shadow authority before coming into its powers on 1 April 1974. Tyne and Wear County Council was abolished in 1986 and North Tyneside became a unitary authority. Political control of the council since 1973 has been held by the following parties:

Leadership
Prior to 2002, political leadership was provided by the leader of the council. In 2002 the council changed to having a directly elected mayor. The mayors since 2002 have been:

Council elections
1995 North Tyneside Metropolitan Borough Council election
1996 North Tyneside Metropolitan Borough Council election
1998 North Tyneside Metropolitan Borough Council election
1999 North Tyneside Metropolitan Borough Council election
2000 North Tyneside Metropolitan Borough Council election
2002 North Tyneside Metropolitan Borough Council election
2003 North Tyneside Metropolitan Borough Council election
2004 North Tyneside Metropolitan Borough Council election
2006 North Tyneside Metropolitan Borough Council election
2007 North Tyneside Metropolitan Borough Council election
2008 North Tyneside Metropolitan Borough Council election
2010 North Tyneside Metropolitan Borough Council election
2011 North Tyneside Metropolitan Borough Council election
2012 North Tyneside Metropolitan Borough Council election
2014 North Tyneside Metropolitan Borough Council election
2015 North Tyneside Metropolitan Borough Council election
2016 North Tyneside Metropolitan Borough Council election
2018 North Tyneside Metropolitan Borough Council election
2019 North Tyneside Metropolitan Borough Council election
2021 North Tyneside Metropolitan Borough Council election

Mayoral elections
North Tyneside Council mayoral election, 2002
North Tyneside Council mayoral by-election, 2003
North Tyneside Council mayoral election, 2005
North Tyneside Council mayoral election, 2009
North Tyneside Council mayoral election, 2013
North Tyneside Council mayoral election, 2017

By-election results

St Mary's by-election, 1 May 1997

Holystone by-election, 22 May 1997

Valley by-election, 26 November 1998

Riverside by-election, 11 March 1999

St Mary's by-election, 27 June 2002

Seatonville by-election, 27 June 2002

Tynemouth by-election, 14 August 2003

Weetslade by-election, 23 June 2005

Preston by-election, 6 October 2005

Benton by-election, 28 September 2006

St Mary's by-election, 5 July 2007

Monkseaton North by-election, 19 June 2008

Tynemouth by-election, 5 February 2009

Preston by-election, 24 September 2009

Battle Hill by-election, 30 September 2010

Wallsend by-election, 16 November 2012

Riverside by-election, 4 July 2013

Camperdown by-election, 9 September 2021

Camperdown by-election, 14 July 2022

References

External links
North Tyneside Metropolitan Borough Council

 
Metropolitan Borough of North Tyneside
Council elections in Tyne and Wear
Metropolitan borough council elections in England